The Schreder Airmate HP-8 is an American, high-wing single seat glider that was designed by Richard Schreder after the loss of the HP-7 in 1957.

Airmate was the name of Schreder's design company.

Design and development
The HP-8 was designed as a result of the lessons learned in flying the HP-7 in the 1957 US Nationals. The HP-7 was destroyed in an aero-towing accident shortly after the Nationals and Schreder decided to improve on the earlier design with the HP-8. As in all of Schreder's designs, the HP stands for "high performance".

The HP-8 is an all-metal design with a very high aspect ratio wing of 24:1, that incorporates a NACA 65 (3)-618 airfoil. The wing is of only 110 square feet (10 m2) in area and this gives a high wing loading of 7.53 lbs/sq ft (36.8 kg/m2), allowing a high glide ratio at a high speed.

Operational history

The HP-8 was entered by Schreder in the 1958 US Nationals and placed first. Schreder set records with the aircraft in all three speed categories in 1959 and also flew it to first place in the 1960 US Nationals.

The sole example built was then sold to George B. Moffat, Jr. who raised the speed records that Schreder had set in the aircraft. The HP-8 was subsequently purchased by Fred Hefty and John Elizalde and donated to the National Soaring Museum.

Aircraft on display
National Soaring Museum - 1. Currently listed as "under restoration"

Specifications (HP-8)

See also

Notes

References

Schreder aircraft
1950s United States sailplanes
Aircraft first flown in 1958
V-tail aircraft